United Left may refer to:

Current parties
Estonian United Left Party
European United Left–Nordic Green Left
United Left (Chile)
United Left (Costa Rica)
United Left (Galicia)
United Left (Netherlands)
United Left (Paraguay)
United Left (San Marino)
United Left (Spain)
United Left (Venezuela)
United Left/The Greens–Assembly for Andalusia

Former parties
United Left (Argentina)
United Left (Austria)
United Left (Bolivia, 1985)
United Left (Bolivia) (1989–c. 2002)
United Left (Denmark), the name used 1870–95 by the current-day Venstre
United Left (East Germany)
United Left (France) (2009–2015)
United Left (Greece)
United Left (Ireland)
United Left (Peru)
United Left (Poland)
United Left (Slovenia)
United Left Alliance, Ireland
United Left Front (1967), India
United Left Front (Nepal, 1990)
United Left Front (Nepal, 2002)
United Left for Cusano Milanino
European United Left (1989–93)
European United Left (1994–95)

Other 
al-Yesaar al-Mouwahid (The United Left) is the name of the newspaper of the Unified Socialist Party (Morocco).

See also
Izquierda Unida (disambiguation)

Political party disambiguation pages